Wallaga Lake National Park is a former national park in New South Wales,  south-west of Sydney and north of Bermagui. It now forms part of a greater Gulaga National Park.

In 2001, as part of the Southern Comprehensive Regional Forest Agreement and at the request of Yuin people, Gulaga National Park was created out of the existing Wallaga Lake National Park, Goura Nature Reserve, and Mt Dromedary Flora Reserve.

In May 2006, ownership to this former National Park, plus the rest of the Gulaga National Park, was restored to the area's traditional owners, in whom legal tenure was vested (in trust) as part of an agreement signed by then New South Wales Environment Minister Bob Debus and representatives for the Yuin people.

The name of the park derived from Wallaga Lake, which is of cultural significance as well as being a source of food for the Yuin people. The black duck, Umbarra, who lives here, is the totem of the Yuin-Monaro people.

See also
 Protected areas of New South Wales (Australia)

References

External links
 Webpage describing the special significance of Wallaga Lake to Yuin peoples
 NSW Department of Environment and Climate Change webpage Gulaga National Park
  NSW Department of Environment and Climate Change webpage Biamanga and Gulaga national parks return to Aboriginal ownership

National parks of New South Wales
Former national parks of Australia
Protected areas established in 1972
Protected areas disestablished in 2006
Lakes of New South Wales